Renhold Castle also known as Howbury, earthwork at Water End Farm,  was a medieval castle located in the village of Renhold, in the hundred of Barford, in the county of Bedfordshire, England.

Renhold Castle was a timber motte-and-bailey castle, encased by a moat. It was located 4 miles east of Bedford Castle and a mile south of Great Barford Castle. Only earthworks remain at the site, which is a Scheduled Monument protected by law.

See also
Castles in Great Britain and Ireland
List of castles in England

References

External links
 English Heritage Monument No. 362997

Castles in Bedfordshire
Scheduled monuments in Bedfordshire
Ringwork castles